Jonathan Roberts may refer to:

Jonathan Roberts (politician) (1771–1854), American farmer, U.S. Senator from Pennsylvania
Jonathan M. Roberts (1821–1888), writer
Jonathan Roberts (writer) (born 1956), American author, screenwriter, and TV producer
Jonathan Roberts (dancer) (born 1974), from the U.S. TV series Dancing with the Stars

See also 
John Roberts (disambiguation)